Inocybe coelestium is a member of the genus Inocybe which is widely distributed in Europe. It was described as new science by mycologist Thomas Kuyper in 1985. The specific epithet coelestium means 'celestials', "the inhabitants of the Mount Olympus, the gods; referring to its hallucinogenic properties."

Biochemistry
Inocybe coelestium contains the compounds psilocybin, psilocin and baeocystin.

See also
List of Inocybe species
List of Psilocybin mushrooms

References

External links

Psychedelic tryptamine carriers
coelestium
Fungi described in 1985
Fungi of Europe
Psychoactive fungi